Alberta Provincial Highway No. 47, commonly referred to as Highway 47, is a north–south highway located in west–central Alberta, Canada that stretches from Highway 16 (Yellowhead Highway), approximately  west of Edson, to Highway 40, approximately  south of Robb.

The highway is paralleled by a spur of the Canadian National Railway that connects the main branch with the Coal Valley. It follows the McLeod River valley south of the Yellowhead Highway, then follows the Embarras River.

Major intersections 
From south to north.

References 

047